1658 Innes, provisional designation , is a rare-type asteroid from the middle region of the asteroid belt, approximately 15 kilometers in diameter. It was named after Robert T. A. Innes.

Discovery 

Innes was discovered on 13 July 1953, by South African astronomer Jacobus Bruwer at Johannesburg Observatory in South Africa.

It was the first numbered discovery of astronomer Jacobus Bruwer. In addition, he also discovered the minor planets 1660 Wood, 1794 Finsen, and 3284 Niebuhr. The asteroid 1811 Bruwer was named in his honour by the Dutch, Dutch-American astronomer trio of the Palomar–Leiden survey.

Orbit and classification 

It orbits the Sun in the central main-belt at a distance of 2.1–3.0 AU once every 4 years and 1 month (1,495 days). Its orbit has an eccentricity of 0.18 and an inclination of 9° with respect to the ecliptic.

Physical characteristics 

In the Tholen taxonomy, Innes has an AS-spectral type, an intermediate form of the rare A-types to the common stony asteroids (also see category listing).

Rotation period 

In May 2005, astronomers Robert Stephens at the Center for Solar System Studies, California, and Lorenzo Franco at Balzaretto Observatory, near Rome, each obtained a rotational lightcurve of Innes. The photometric observations gave an identical rotation period of  hours with a brightness variation of 0.22 and 0.25 magnitude, respectively.

Diameter and albedo 

According to the 2014-revised survey result of NASA's Wide-field Infrared Survey Explorer with its subsequent NEOWISE mission, Innes measures 13.35 kilometers in diameter and its surface has an albedo of 0.248, while the Collaborative Asteroid Lightcurve Link assumes a standard albedo for stony asteroids of 0.20 and calculates a diameter of 14.76 kilometers with an absolute magnitude of 11.52.

Naming 

This minor planet was named for Scottish–South African astronomer Robert T. A. Innes (1861–1933), first director of the discovering Union Observatory from 1903 to 1927 (originally named Transvaal Observatory). He was a skilled observational astronomer, famous for his deliberate search and discovery of the nearest star, Proxima Centauri, in 1915. He also made important theoretical and computational contributions to celestial mechanics and to the irregular rotation of the Earth. The astronomer is also honored by the lunar crater Innes. The official  was published by the Minor Planet Center on 1 July 1972.

References

External links 
 Asteroid Lightcurve Database (LCDB), query form (info )
 Dictionary of Minor Planet Names, Google books
 Asteroids and comets rotation curves, CdR – Observatoire de Genève, Raoul Behrend
 Discovery Circumstances: Numbered Minor Planets (1)-(5000)  – Minor Planet Center
 
 

001658
Discoveries by Jacobus Albertus Bruwer
Named minor planets
001658
19530713